Three Wishes is an album by the American jazz band Spyro Gyra, released in 1992 by GRP Records.

Production
The album was produced by Jay Beckenstein. The band recorded the songs in less than a week, but spent two months in total working on Three Wishes. There was more of an effort to record live in studio, after Beckenstein heard comments praising the band's live show over its albums. Beckenstein also considered the songs on Three Wishes to be more thematically linked to each other rather than merely a collection of whatever songs the band had worked up. "Jennifer's Lullaby" is dedicated to Stan Getz.

Critical reception
{{Album ratings
| rev1 = AllMusic
| rev1Score = <ref name=""allmusic"">{{cite web|url=https://www.allmusic.com/album/three-wishes-mw0000612130|title=Three Wishes|work=AllMusic|accessdate=2021-11-16}}</ref>
|rev2 = The Indianapolis Star|rev2score = 
}}The Washington Post deemed the album "a good deal less predictable and glossy than usual." The Toronto Star wrote that "the veteran group is inoffensively competent, swings lightly despite the ugly rock 'n' roll drumming but contains about as much inspiration as a night watching Valium-powered TV soaps." The Indianapolis Star determined that Three Wishes'' "is far more orchestrated than improvised, yet that keeps and perhaps deepens its entertainment edge."

Track listing 
 "Pipo's Song" (Julio Fernandez) – 4:53
 "Introduction to Breathless" (Jay Beckenstein) – 1:05
 "Breathless" (Beckenstein) – 5:19
 "Introduction to Real Time" (Dave Samuels)
 "Real Time" (Samuels) – 3:56
 "Jennifer's Lullaby" (Beckenstein) – 5:40
 "Whitewater" (Beckenstein) – 6:12
 "Inside Your Love" (Jeremy Wall) – 4:07
 "Nothing to Lose" (Beckenstein, Fernandez) – 5:03
 "Three Wishes" (Beckenstein) – 4:47
 "Gliding" (Beckenstein, Samuels) – 4:50
 "Cabana Carioca" (Wall) – 5:18
 "Rollercoaster" (Tom Schuman) – 4:29
 "Three Wishes (reprise)" (Beckenstein) – 1:41

Personnel 
Spyro Gyra
 Jay Beckenstein – saxophone
 Tom Schuman – keyboards
 Julio Fernández – guitars
 Scott Ambush – bass guitar
 Joel Rosenblatt – drums
 Dave Samuels – vibraphone, marimba

Additional Personnel
 Sammy Figueroa – percussion
 Larry Williams – saxophone
 Bill Reichenbach Jr. – trombone, bass trumpet
 Gary Grant – trumpet
 Jerry Hey – trumpet, horn arrangements

Production 
 Jay Beckenstein – producer 
 Jeremy Wall – assistant producer
 Dave Grusin – executive producer 
 Larry Rosen – executive producer 
 Larry Swist – recording, engineer, mixing 
 Kevin Becka – assistant engineer 
 Tom Bender – assistant engineer 
 Doug Rose – assistant engineer 
 Bob Ludwig – mastering
 Michael Pollard – production coordinator 
 Andy Baltimore – creative director
 David Gibb – graphic design 
 Scott Johnson – graphic design
 Sonny Mediana – graphic design
 Andy Ruggirello – graphic design
 Dan Serrano – graphic design
 Michael Cobb – illustrations
 Frank Linder – photography 

Studios
 Recorded at BearTracks Studios (Suffern, New York); Carriage House Studios (Stamford, CT); Lighthouse Studios (Los Angeles, California).
 Mixed at BearTracks Studios and Lighthouse Studios.
 Mastered at Masterdisk (New York City, New York).

References

External links
 Spyro Gyra official web site

Spyro Gyra albums
1992 albums
GRP Records albums